Mohawk Industries is an American flooring manufacturer based in Calhoun, Georgia, United States. Mohawk produces floor covering products for residential and commercial applications in North America and residential applications in Europe. The company manufacturing portfolio consists of soft flooring products (broadloom carpet, carpet tiles, carpet cushion and rugs), hard flooring products (ceramic and porcelain tile, natural stone and hardwood flooring), laminate flooring, sheet vinyl and luxury vinyl tile as well as ceramic and porcelain floor wall tiles and porcelain, natural stone and quartz countertops. In Europe, the company also produces and sells insulation, panels and mezzanine flooring. The company employs 43,000 people in operations in Australia, Brazil, Canada, Europe, Malaysia, Mexico, New Zealand, Russia and the United States.

In 2015, Mohawk was recognized as the most used, top-brand familiarity, and top-quality rating carpet product by the Builder magazine.

History
William Shuttleworth and his four sons arrived in the United States in 1875 and set up a carpet mill in the Hudson Valley upon arrival. After William Shuttleworth died, the four sons moved to Amsterdam, New York in 1878 and took over an empty factory there. The company incorporated as the Shuttleworth Brothers Company in 1902.

The company adopted the name Mohawk Carpet Mills (or Mohawk Mills, for short) in 1920, when it merged with McCleary, Wallin and Crouse, another mill in Amsterdam. It became the country's sole weaver to offer an entire line of domestic carpets, also creating the industry's first textured design and sculptured weave.

In 1956, Mohawk Carpet Mills merged with  Alexander Smith, Inc. to become Mohasco Corporation, a company large enough to appear on the first Fortune 500 rankings. Mohasco faced competition from new tufted carpet operations in Georgia, which used synthetic fibers such as nylon and polyester rather than the traditional wool used in woven carpets. To compete in a changing industry, Mohasco gradually moved manufacturing south into the Carolinas and eventually Georgia. In 1963, the company turned some of its attention to furniture manufacturing through acquisitions.

Carpet manufacturing at the Amsterdam site ended by 1968 and the last corporate offices left by 1987. In 1988, Mohasco was purchased by MHS Holdings in a leveraged buyout, and the company's carpet business was spun off from Mohasco to form Mohawk Industries.

In 1992, Mohawk went public with its shares traded first on the NASDAQ Stock Exchange under the ticker symbol "MWK" and currently on the New York Stock Exchange under the ticker symbol "MHK."
Mohasco's remaining assets were sold to other investors, and the company was later dissolved. Through 2016, Mohawk Industries has acquired 34 companies into its conglomerate, and now operates manufacturing facilities in 15 countries—the U.S., Mexico, Brazil, Ireland, the U.K., Belgium, France, the Netherlands, Luxembourg, Spain, Italy, the Czech Republic, Bulgaria, Russia and Malaysia. The company's present Chairman and CEO is Jeffrey Lorberbaum.

Mohawk's open line brands include American Olean, Daltile, Decortiles, Durkan, Eliane, Feltex, Foss, Godfrey Hirst, Karastan, Kerama Marazzi, Marazzi, Moduleo, Mohawk, Mohawk Group, Mohawk Home, Pergo, Quick-Step, Ragno and Unilin.

Mohawk Industries, Inc. v. Carpenter
In 2009, it was involved in the Supreme Court case Mohawk Industries, Inc. v. Carpenter. The court found against Mohawk Industries, in a 9–0 decision.

References

External links 

Companies listed on the New York Stock Exchange
Carpet manufacturing companies
Manufacturing companies based in Georgia (U.S. state)
Textile companies of the United States
Manufacturing companies established in 1878
1878 establishments in New York (state)
Gordon County, Georgia
1992 initial public offerings